Hot 100 (call sign: 8HOT) is a CHR-formatted commercial radio station in Darwin, Northern Territory, Australia. The station begin broadcasting on 1 July 1991 and has a relay in Katherine and Jabiru.

The current programming director is Dave Daly and the general manager is Michael Harvey.

In November 2021, Hot 100, along with other stations owned by Grant Broadcasters, were acquired by the Australian Radio Network. This deal will allow Grant's stations, including Hot 100, to access ARN's iHeartRadio platform in regional areas. The deal was finalized on January 4, 2022. It is expected Hot 100 will integrate with ARN's KIIS Network, but will retain its current name according to the press release from ARN.

References

External links
Official website

Radio stations in Darwin, Northern Territory
Radio stations established in 1991
Contemporary hit radio stations in Australia
Australian Radio Network
1991 establishments in Australia